Dušan Kerkez (born July 20, 1952) is a former Serbian professional basketball player.

External links
 Dušan Kerkez Bio

1952 births
Living people
KK IMT Beograd players
KK Partizan players
KK Vršac players
People from Vršac
Serbian men's basketball players